The 1998 Giro del Trentino was the 22nd edition of the Tour of the Alps cycle race and was held on 27 April to 30 April 1998. The race started in Arco and finished in Riva del Garda. The race was won by Paolo Savoldelli.

General classification

References

1998
1998 in road cycling
1998 in Italian sport